Pancha Dravida is one of the two major groupings of Brahmins in Hinduism, of which the other was Pancha-Gauda.

In Rajatarangini 
Kalhana, in his Rajatarangini (c. 12th century CE), classifies the following five Brahmin communities as Pancha Dravida, stating that they reside to the south of the Vindhyas:

 Karnataka (Karnataka Brahmins)
 Tailanga (Telugu Brahmins)
 Dravida (Brahmins of Tamil Nadu and Kerala)
 Maharashtraka (Maharashtrian Brahmins)
 Gurjara (Gujarati, Marwari and Mewari Brahmins)

In the kaifiyats 
The Maratha-era kaifiyats (bureaucratic records) of Deccan, which give an account of the society in the southern Maratha country, mention the following Brahmin communities as Pancha Dravida:

 Andhra-Purva Desastha
 Dravida Desastha
 Karnataka Brahmins
 Desastha

The kafiyats classify the Gurjara Brahmins as Pancha Gauda. They also mention the following 16 sub-castes of the Pancha-Dravidas:

 Smarta
 Konkanastha
 Karhade
 Varkari
 Madhyandin
 Vanas
 Karnatak
 Shashtik
 Nandavamshik
 Srivaishnav Telang
 Srivaishnava
 Pratham-Shakhikanva
 Kirvant
 Sihavasai
 Nurcher
 Shenavi
 Govalkonde

References

Brahmin communities
Indian castes
Ethnic groups in Nepal